Chapel of Garioch is a hamlet in Aberdeenshire, Scotland, located 4 miles (6 km) west of Inverurie. The Balquhain stone circle is nearby.

The church, St Mary's Chapel, shares a parish with Blairdaff. It was formerly under the patronage of the local Elphinstone lairds.

Chapel of Garioch is in the West Garioch ward of Aberdeenshire Council.

History
The hamlet was originally called Durock (Logie Durno in Gaelic) but was renamed when the Chapel was built in the 17th century.
The Battle of Harlaw was fought here in 1411.

Pittodrie House is a Category B listed building, and former seat of the Erskine family: it consists of a medieval tower house (c1490), with later Jacobean (1675) and neo-Jacobean (1841) additions.

References

Hamlets in Scotland
Villages in Aberdeenshire
Inverurie